Neacomys musseri, also known as Musser's neacomys or Musser's bristly mouse, is a rodent species from South America. It is found in far western Brazil and southeastern Peru.

References

Duff, A. and Lawson, A. 2004.  Mammals of the World: A checklist. New Haven: A & C Black. . 

Neacomys
Mammals described in 2000
Taxa named by James L. Patton